Faramea is a genus of plants in the family Rubiaceae.

Species include:
 F. angusta C. M. Taylor
 F. biflora J. G. Jardim & Zappi
 F. capillipes
 F. exemplaris Standl.
 F. hymenocalyx M. Gomes
 F. nocturna J. G. Jardim & Zappi
 F. oligantha Müll. Arg.
 F. paratiensis M. Gomes
 F. picinguabae M. Gomes
 F. quadricostata
 F. vasquezii C. M. Taylor

References 

 
Rubiaceae genera
Taxonomy articles created by Polbot